Steve Meerson is an American screenwriter who contributed to the screenplay for Star Trek IV: The Voyage Home (1986).

Filmography
Anna and the King (1999)
Double Impact (1991)
Back to the Beach (1987)
Star Trek IV: The Voyage Home (1986)

References

External links

American male screenwriters
Living people
Year of birth missing (living people)
Place of birth missing (living people)